Ooh Wee may refer to:

"Ooh Wee" (song), a song by Mark Ronson from the 2003 album Here Comes the Fuzz
"Ooh Wee", a song by LL Cool J from the 2006 album Todd Smith
"Ooh Wee", a single by American pop musician Aaron Carter featuring rapper Pat SoLo

See also
"Ooohhhwee", a song by Master P from his 2001 album Game Face
"Oo-Wee", a song by Ringo Starr from his 1974 album Goodnight Vienna
"OooWee", a song by Rapsody from her 2017 album Laila's Wisdom